Saumarapitha is one of the four Kamarupa Pithas, the geographical divisions of ancient Kamarupa.

Boundaries
Sources defines boundaries of Saumarapitha as area between from the Bhairavi and the Dikarai river.

See also
 Swarnapitha
 Ratnapitha

References

Kamarupa (former kingdom)